"Saturday Night" is a song by German dance-pop group Sqeezer, not to be confused with Whigfield's No.1 hit "Saturday Night". It was released on 29 January 1997 as the fourth single released from their debut album, Drop Your Pants (1996). The song charted in Germany, reaching at number 43 on the Offizielle Top 100. In Spain, it was certified gold by PROMUSICAE, peaking at number five on the Spanish maxi-singles chart. The song also reached number five in Czech Republic.

Track listing
 CD-maxi
 "Saturday Night" (Radio-/Video-Single) – 3:52
 "Saturday Night" (Party-Single) – 3:56
 "Saturday Night" (Extended Video-Version) – 5:25
 "Saturday Night" (Set-A-Day-Night-House-Mix) – 5:06
 "Tic Tac" – 1:35

Charts

Weekly charts

Year-end charts

References

1997 singles
Sqeezer songs
1996 songs
Songs about nights